The Great North Open was the final name of a European Tour golf tournament which was played at Slaley Hall, a country house golf resort in Northumberland in North East England, six years out of seven between 1996 and 2002. It was also played as the Slaley Hall Northumberland Challenge and the Compaq European Grand Prix. The winners included one major champion, Retief Goosen, and two winners of the European Tour Order of Merit, Colin Montgomerie and Lee Westwood. The prize fund peaked at €1,311,090 in 2001 before dropping to €935,760 in the tournament's last year, which was below average for a European Tour event at that time.

Winners

Notes

References

External links 
Coverage on the European Tour's official site

Former European Tour events
Golf tournaments in England
Sport in Northumberland
Recurring sporting events established in 1996
Recurring sporting events disestablished in 2002
1996 establishments in England
2002 disestablishments in England
Defunct sports competitions in the United Kingdom